Denmark was represented by Katy Bødtger, with the song "Det var en yndig tid", at the 1960 Eurovision Song Contest, which took place on 29 March in London. "Det var en yndig tid" was chosen as the Danish entry at the Dansk Melodi Grand Prix on 6 February.

Before Eurovision

Dansk Melodi Grand Prix 1960
The DMGP was held at Radiohuset in Frederiksberg, hosted by Sejr Volmer-Sørensen. Seven songs took part, with the winner chosen by a ten-member jury each nominating their favourite song. Denmark's 1957 representative Gustav Winckler was among the other participants.

At Eurovision
On the night of the final Katy Bødtger performed 4th in the running order, following Luxembourg and preceding Belgium. In style the song owed more to stage musicals than to contemporary music, and Bødtger complimented its rather quaint, old-fashioned sound by performing in a 19th-century fashioned gown, complete with bonnet and parasol. At the close of voting "Det var en yndig tid" had received 4 points, placing Denmark joint 10th (with Sweden) of the 13 entries. The Danish jury awarded its highest mark (4) to contest winners France.

Voting 
Every country had a jury of ten people. Every jury member could give one point to his or her favourite song.

References 

1960
Countries in the Eurovision Song Contest 1960
Eurovision

da:Dansk Melodi Grand Prix 1960
fo:Dansk Melodi Grand Prix 1960